Meir Mazuz (born March 27, 1945, in Tunisia) is a political leader and Sephardic Haredi rabbi in Israel, the dean of the Kisse Rahamim yeshivah, and the son of rabbi Matzliah Mazuz of Tunis (1912-1971), who was assassinated. Meir Mazuz serves as the spiritual leader of Yachad. He is the rabbinic leader (mara d'atra) of the Tunisian Jews.

References

Israeli Orthodox Jews
Sephardic Haredi rabbis in Israel
Israeli people of Tunisian-Jewish descent
Living people
1945 births